Cuca Legal is a Brazilian telenovela produced and broadcast by TV Globo. It premiered on 27 January 1975 and ended on 13 June 1975, with a total of 119 episodes. It's the fifteenth "novela das sete" to be aired at the timeslot. It is created by Marcos Rey, directed by Gonzaga Blota, Oswaldo Loureiro and Jardel Mello.

Cast

References 

1975 telenovelas
Brazilian telenovelas
TV Globo telenovelas
1975 Brazilian television series debuts
1975 Brazilian television series endings
Portuguese-language telenovelas
Television shows set in Rio de Janeiro (city)